Adam Olsen is a Canadian politician, who was elected to the Legislative Assembly of British Columbia in the 2017 provincial election. He represents the electoral district of Saanich North and the Islands as a member of the Green Party of British Columbia caucus.

Political career 
Olsen was elected to the Legislative Assemby of British Columbia in the general 2017 provincial election in the riding of Saanich North and the Islands. Olsen previously ran in the same district in the 2013 provincial election, losing narrowly to Gary Holman. Following the election, he served as the party's interim leader between the resignation of Jane Sterk and the election of Andrew Weaver.

Olsen joins the first minority government in British Columbia since the 1952 elections. In the 2017 British Columbia general election the Liberal Party won 43 seats, the New Democratic Party won 41 seats, and the Green Party won three seats. As no single party won a majority of seats, the Green Party was approached by both the BC Liberal Party and BC NDP to determine whether they would support a minority government or a coalition government headed by either party. No grand coalition or agreement between the two large parties, excluding the Greens, was seriously considered. On May 29, NDP leader John Horgan and Green leader Andrew Weaver announced that the Greens would provide confidence and supply to an NDP minority government, a position which was endorsed the following day by the members of both caucuses.

On October 7, 2019, Andrew Weaver announced he will step down as party leader once a new leader has been chosen. On December 20, 2019, Olsen was appointed interim leader, following the resignation of Andrew Weaver. He took office effective January 6, 2020.

Olsen is a member of the Tsartlip First Nation in Brentwood Bay and served as a two-term Central Saanich Councillor prior to his election.

Electoral record

References

1976 births
Living people
21st-century Canadian politicians
21st-century First Nations people
British Columbia municipal councillors
Coast Salish people
First Nations politicians
Green Party of British Columbia MLAs
Leaders of the Green Party of British Columbia